Malcolm Graham (26 January 1934 – 12 September 2015) was an English footballer who played as a striker, mainly for Barnsley and Leyton Orient.

Graham joined Barnsley from non-league Hall Green in 1953, while still working as a miner at Haigh Colliery. He stayed with Barnsley for several seasons, but left when the club was relegated at the end of the 1958–59 season. After a brief spell at Bristol City, he moved to Leyton Orient for £8000 on 20 June 1960.

At Orient, Graham was part of the team that gained promotion to the First Division in 1961–62, scoring both goals in the 2–0 win over Bury that sent them up on the last day of the season. He was joint top scorer with Dave Dunmore in Orient's single season in the top flight, scoring a hat-trick in the 9–2 thrashing of Chester in the League Cup. However, he left Orient at the end of that season to join Queens Park Rangers. Only staying for one season, he returned to Barnsley before moving back into non-league football.

Graham retired due to a long-standing knee injury while playing for Alfreton Town, and later worked for the East Midlands Gas Board.

Malcolm Graham died in Barnsley on Saturday 12 September 2015.

References

1934 births
English footballers
Association football forwards
Barnsley F.C. players
Bristol City F.C. players
Leyton Orient F.C. players
Queens Park Rangers F.C. players
Buxton F.C. players
Alfreton Town F.C. players
Footballers from Wakefield
2015 deaths